{{Infobox election
| election_name     = 2004 United States Senate election in Idaho
| country           = Idaho
| type              = presidential
| ongoing           = no
| previous_election = 1998 United States Senate election in Idaho
| previous_year     = 1998
| next_election     = 2010 United States Senate election in Idaho
| next_year         = 2010
| election_date     = November 2, 2004
| image_size        = 125x136px

| image1            = Mike Crapo official photo.jpg
| nominee1          = Mike Crapo
| party1            = Republican Party (United States)
| popular_vote1     = 499,796
| percentage1       = 99.2%

| map_image         = 2004 United States Senate election in Idaho results map by county.svg
| map_size          = 160px
| map_caption       = County resultsCrapo:  
| title             = U.S. Senator
| before_election   = Mike Crapo
| before_party      = Republican Party (United States)
| after_election    = Mike Crapo
| after_party       = Republican Party (United States)
}}

The 2004 United States Senate election in Idaho''' took place on November 2, 2004 alongside other elections to the United States Senate in other states as well as elections to the United States House of Representatives and various state and local elections. Incumbent Republican U.S. Senator Mike Crapo ran for re-election and won a second term in office in a landslide after no one filed for the Democratic Party nomination. Democrat Scott McClure conducted a write-in campaign but only received 4,136 votes, or about 1% of those cast.

Republican primary

Candidates 
 Mike Crapo, incumbent U.S. Senator

Results

General election

Candidates 
On ballot
 Mike Crapo (R), incumbent U.S. Senator

Write-in
 Scott F. McClure (D), Army veteran

Predictions

Results 

Crapo won every county with over 90% of the vote. His weakest performance by far was in Democratic-leaning Latah County, where he got 95.6% of the vote to McClure's 4.4%.

See also 
 2004 United States Senate elections

References 

2004 Idaho elections
Idaho
2004